Emamzadeh Shir Mard (also Romanized as Emāmzādeh Shīr Mard; also known as Shīr Mard) is a village in Bakesh-e Yek Rural District, in the Central District of Mamasani County, Fars Province, Iran. At the 2006 census, its population was 87, in 22 families.

References 

Populated places in Mamasani County